In psychology, disinhibition is a lack of restraint manifested in disregard of social conventions, impulsivity, and poor risk assessment. Disinhibition affects motor, instinctual, emotional, cognitive, and perceptual aspects with signs and symptoms similar to the diagnostic criteria for mania. Hypersexuality, hyperphagia, and aggressive outbursts are indicative of disinhibited instinctual drives.

Clinical concept
According to Grafman, et al., "disinhibition" is a lack of restraint manifested in several ways, affecting motor, instinctual, emotional, cognitive, and perceptual aspects with signs and symptoms, e.g., impulsivity, disregard for others and social norms, aggressive outbursts, misconduct and oppositional behaviours, disinhibited instinctual drives including risk taking behaviours and hypersexuality. Disinhibition is a common symptom following brain injury, or lesions, particularly to the frontal lobe and primarily to the orbitofrontal cortex. The neuropsychiatric sequelae following brain injuries could include diffuse cognitive impairment, with more prominent deficits in the rate of information processing, attention, memory, cognitive flexibility, and problem solving. Prominent impulsivity, affective instability, and disinhibition are seen frequently, secondary to injury to frontal, temporal, and limbic areas. In association with the typical cognitive deficits, these sequelae characterise the frequently noted "personality changes" in TBI (Traumatic Brain Injury) patients.

Disinhibition syndromes, in brain injuries and insults including brain tumors, strokes and epilepsy range from mildly inappropriate social behaviour, lack of control over one's behaviour to the full-blown mania, depending on the lesions to specific brain regions. Several studies in brain traumas and insults have demonstrated significant associations between disinhibition syndromes and dysfunction of orbitofrontal and basotemporal cortices, affecting visuospatial functions, somatosensation, and spatial memory, motoric, instinctive, affective, and intellectual behaviours.

Disinhibition syndromes have also been reported with mania-like manifestations in old age with lesions to the orbito-frontal and basotemporal cortex involving limbic and frontal connections (orbitofrontal circuit), especially in the right hemisphere. Behavioural disinhibition as a result of damage to frontal lobe could be seen as a result of consumption of alcohol and central nervous system depressants drugs, e.g., benzodiazepines that disinhibit the frontal cortex from self-regulation and control. It has also been argued that ADHD, hyperactive/impulsive subtype have a general behavioural disinhibition beyond impulsivity and many morbidities or complications of ADHD, e.g., conduct disorder, anti-social personality disorder, substance abuse, and risk taking behaviours are all consequences of untreated behavioural disinhibition.

Treatment approaches 

Positive Behaviour Support (PBS) is a treatment approach that looks at the best way to work with each individual with disabilities. A behavioural therapist conducts a functional analysis of behaviour which helps to determine ways to improve the quality of life for the person and does not just deal with problem behaviour.

A quick guide for staff to remind about key elements of treatment for a person with disabilities is below. There are two main objectives: reacting situationally when the behavior occurs, and then acting proactively to prevent the behaviour from occurring.

Reactive
Reactive strategies include:
 Redirection: distracting the person by offering another activity, or changing the topic of conversation. Offer the person a choice of 2 or 3 things, but no more than 3, because this can be overwhelming. In offering a choice, make sure to pause to allow the person time to process the information and give a response.
 Talking to the person and finding out what the problem is
 Working out what the person's behaviour is trying to communicate
 Crisis management

Proactive
Proactive strategies to prevent problems can include:
 Change the environment: This can include increasing opportunities for access to a variety of activities, balancing cognitively and physically demanding activities with periods of rest, providing a predictable environment in order to reduce the level of cognitive demands on the person, trying to provide consistent routines (be mindful of events that may not occur, try not to make promises that cannot be kept, if unable to go out at a particular time then say so), checking for safety in the home environment (e.g., changing/moving furniture).
 Teach a skill: These can include general skills development of useful communication strategies, coping skills (e.g. teach the person what to do when feeling angry, anxious)
 Individual behaviour support plans: These involve reinforcing specific desirable behavior and ignoring the specific undesirable behavior (unless it is dangerous, the priority is to keep both people safe through a crisis plan which might involve removing sharp objects or weapons, escaping to a safe place, giving the person time to calm down), avoiding things you know upsets the person, strategies to increase engagement in activities.

Broadly speaking, when the behavior occurs, assertively in a nonjudgmental, clear, unambiguous way provide feedback that the behavior is inappropriate, and say what you prefer instead. For example, "Jane, you're standing too close when you are speaking to me, I feel uncomfortable, please take a step back", or "I don't like it when you say I look hot in front of your wife, I feel uncomfortable, I am your Attendant Carer/Support Worker, I am here to help you with your shopping" Also in non-verbal communication, communication can appear in other forms, one could say "I don't like it when you dart your eyes at me in that way". Then re-direct to the next activity. Any subsequent behavior ignore. Then generally, as almost all behavior is communication, understand what the behavior is trying to communicate and look at ways to have the need met in more appropriate ways.

See also
 Boldness
 Frontotemporal dementia
 Online disinhibition effect
 Orbitofrontal cortex

References

External links
 The Online Disinhibition Effect 
 Social Behaviour In Cyberspace
 External Inhibition & Disinhibition

Human behavior
Abnormal psychology